Uttarakhand Waqf Board is a statutory board of the Government of Uttarakhand in India.

History
Central Waqf Council was set up by the Government of India's Ministry of Minority Affairs as an Indian statutory body in 1964 under Waqf Act, 1954 (now a sub section the Waqf Act, 1995) for the purpose of advising it on matters pertaining to working of the State Waqf Boards and proper administration of the Waqfs in the country. Waqf is a permanent dedication of movable or immovable properties for religious, pious or charitable purposes as recognized by Muslim law, given by philanthropists. The grant is known as Mushrut-ul-Khidmat, while a person making such dedication is known as Waqf.

The Uttarakhand Waqf Board, was established by the Government of Uttarakhand under Central Waqf Council on 5 August 2003 vide notification on Gazzete of Uttarakhand.

List of chairman

Properties
District wise Immovable and Assessable Waqf Properties

References

External links
 Search Waqf Property
 Central Waqf Council
 Central Ministry For Minority Affairs
 Maulana Azad Education Foundation
 National Minorities Development and Finance Corporation

State agencies of Uttarakhand
Government of Uttarakhand
Islamic organisations based in India
2003 establishments in Uttarakhand
Government agencies established in 2003